Pickens is an unincorporated community in Desha County, Arkansas, United States. Pickens has a post office with ZIP code 71662.

References

Unincorporated communities in Desha County, Arkansas
Unincorporated communities in Arkansas